Oliver Celestin, Jr. (born February 25, 1981 in New Orleans, Louisiana) is a former American football safety. He was signed by the New York Jets as an undrafted free agent in 2004. He played college football at Texas Southern.

External links
Arizona Cardinals bio
Kansas City Chiefs bio
New York Jets bio

1981 births
Living people
St. Augustine High School (New Orleans) alumni
Players of American football from New Orleans
American football safeties
Texas Southern Tigers football players
New York Jets players
Seattle Seahawks players
Berlin Thunder players
Arizona Cardinals players
Kansas City Chiefs players